Albany is a city on the east shore of San Francisco Bay in northwestern Alameda County, California. The population was 20,271 at the 2020 census.

History

In 1908, a group of local women protested the dumping of Berkeley garbage in their community. Armed with two shotguns and a twenty-two-caliber rifle, they confronted the drivers of the wagons near what is now the corner of San Pablo Avenue and Buchanan Street. The women told the drivers of the horse-drawn garbage wagons to go home, which they did quickly and without complaint.  Shortly thereafter, the residents of the town voted to incorporate as the City of Ocean View. In 1909, voters changed the name of the city, primarily to distinguish the city from the adjacent section of Berkeley which had previously been named Ocean View. On a vote of 38 to 6  the city was renamed in honor of Albany, New York, the birthplace of the city's first mayor, Frank Roberts.

Albany has a history of real estate discrimination, which made it difficult for non-white buyers to acquire property and build homes in Albany.

Geography

The principal shopping street in Albany is Solano Avenue, which cuts across the city from west to east. Another important street is San Pablo Avenue, which travels from north to south.

Albany is located on the eastern shore of San Francisco Bay, bordering the city of Berkeley to the south and east, and the Contra Costa County cities of El Cerrito and Richmond to the north. Albany's northern and southern borders are defined by two creeks, Codornices Creek on the south and Cerrito Creek on the north. Cerrito Creek takes its name from "El Cerrito de San Antonio", now known as Albany Hill. The hill's unusual location near the bay shore makes it a prominent landmark in the East Bay. The rest of the city is relatively flat by Bay Area standards, except for a small area near the base of the Berkeley Hills.

Albany's waterfront has undergone significant man-made changes; the most prominent landform is now the Albany Bulb, a former garbage landfill jutting out into San Francisco Bay. The bulb was the site of a small art colony and shanty town until it was cleared to turn the area into part of the new Eastshore State Park.

University Village, a housing unit of the University of California Berkeley, is located in Albany.

Demographics

The 2010 United States Census reported that Albany had a population of 18,539. , Albany had a population of 18,969. The racial makeup of Albany was 10,128 (54.6%) White, 645 (3.5%) African American, 88 (0.5%) Native American, 5,790 (31.2%) Asian, 37 (0.2%) Pacific Islander, 607 (3.3%) from other races, and 1,244 (6.7%) from two or more races. Hispanic or Latino of any race were 1,891 persons (10.2%).

The Census reported that 18,454 people (99.5% of the population) lived in households, 74 (0.4%) lived in non-institutionalized group quarters, and 11 (0.1%) were institutionalized.

There were 7,401 households, out of which 2,909 (39.3%) had children under the age of 18 living in them, 3,801 (51.4%) were opposite-sex married couples living together, 883 (11.9%) had a female householder with no husband present, 295 (4.0%) had a male householder with no wife present. There were 341 (4.6%) unmarried opposite-sex partnerships, and 123 (1.7%) same-sex married couples or partnerships; 1,862 households (25.2%) were made up of individuals, and 593 (8.0%) had someone living alone who was 65 years of age or older. The average household size was 2.49. There were 4,979 families (67.3% of all households); the average family size was 3.00.

The population was diverse in age, with 4,630 people (25.0%) under the age of 18, 1,006 people (5.4%) aged 18 to 24, 6,154 people (33.2%) aged 25 to 44, 4,902 people (26.4%) aged 45 to 64, and 1,847 people (10.0%) who were 65 years of age or older. The median age was 37.0 years. For every 100 females, there were 90.8 males. For every 100 females age 18 and over, there were 86.9 males.

The homeowner vacancy rate was 1.0%; the rental vacancy rate was 6.2%. 9,070 people (48.9% of the population) lived in owner-occupied housing units and 9,384 people (50.6%) lived in rental housing units.

Through the early 1940's Albany "remained closed to African Americans." The Black population of Albany in 1940 was 3 persons. Between 1950 and 1960, the Black population of Albany fell 95% from 1778 to 75.

Economy
The major retail and business areas in Albany are Solano Avenue, which is a pedestrian-oriented street lined with mainly small shops, restaurants, and services; San Pablo Avenue, which is more automobile-oriented; and an area near the Eastshore Freeway, which currently houses a two-story Target store.

In 2006 voters approved of measure D which allows one medical cannabis dispensary in the town in addition to measure C to build a new emergency operations center with "sustainable features", an addition to the civic center of Albany.

Albany is the site of Golden Gate Fields, the only horse racing track in the Bay Area.

Real estate prices have been rising steeply in recent years. The median price of a single family home and condo in Census 2000, June 2007, November 2009, July 2011, August 2013 and August 2014 were $334,800, $687,500, $610,000, $590,000, $625,750 and $820,050 respectively.

Politics 
According to the California Secretary of State, as of February 10, 2019, Albany has 11,344 registered voters. Of those, 7,489 (66%) are registered Democrats, 512 (4.5%) are registered Republicans, and 2,917 (25.7%) have declined to state a political party.

In 1966, Albany was home to a John Birch Society bookstore known as the American Opinion Library. 
  
On July 30 1968, the John Birch society Truth About Civil Turmoil committee hosted an event at the Albany Veterans Memorial Building which included a speech by a former klansman, Delmar Dennis.

Top employers
According to Albany's 2013 Comprehensive Annual Financial Report, the top employers in the city were:

Education

Public schools in Albany are operated by the Albany Unified School District, a special-purpose district whose borders match the city's. The school district operates three elementary schools (Marin Elementary School, Ocean View Elementary School and Cornell Elementary School), one middle school (Albany Middle School), one traditional high school (Albany High School), and one continuation high school (MacGregor High School), in addition to the Albany Children's Center. Albany High School is known as one of the best public schools of the San Francisco Bay Area for its academic excellence. The high school had a graduation rate of 92.1%, according to the 2009–10 School Accountability Report Card for the prior academic year.

There are two private high schools in Albany: Tilden Preparatory School (formerly School for Independent Learners) on Solano Avenue and St. Mary's College High School, whose campus straddles the border with Berkeley, CA.

The University of California, Berkeley owns a large student housing complex in Albany, University Village, which is primarily used for family housing.

Arts, culture, and recreation

The Solano Avenue Stroll, an annual street festival held on Solano Avenue in Albany and Berkeley, attracts more than 250,000 visitors on the second Sunday of September. The event was started in 1975 by The Iris store owner and Solano Avenue Association founder Ira Klein as a "thank you party" from Solano Avenue business owners to customers. The Library of Congress designated the Solano Stroll as a "National Local Legacy" in 2001.

Albany provides both the locale and the title for one of the best-known poems in language poetry, by former long-time Albany resident, poet Ron Silliman.

Albany is home to Golden Gate Fields, the only commercial racetrack in the Bay Area, as well as the Eastshore State Park which skirts the San Francisco Bay, and the Albany Bulb.

Albany has a strong school music program. High school music groups, both instrumental and choral, have performed at the CMEA, Reno Jazz, and other festivals. The Albany High School Jazz Band was also accepted at the Essentially Ellington festival at the Lincoln Center in 2010. Albany was one of 15 schools accepted into the festival.

Albany Strollers & Rollers is a volunteer group dedicated to service and advocacy for bicycling and walking.

Friends of Five Creeks is an all-volunteer group working hands-on for clean water and healthy watersheds.

The Albany Sauna is one of the oldest Finnish-style Sauna open to the public in North America. Built in 1934 by Finnish-American Henry Walter Lundgren (a founding member of the Finnish Lodge in West Berkeley), the original furnace and rooms have been maintained to produce one of the most authentic sauna experiences outside of Finland.

The Albany Community Center was designed by architect Robert Marquis and opened in 1994. It houses the Albany Public Library on one side and the Community Center on the other, and is host to many different community events and cultural activities.

Notable people
 Tim Armstrong, musician and lead singer of Rancid and Operation Ivy 
 Anna Baltzer, activist
 Walter De Maria, sculptor
 Daveed Diggs, actor, rapper
 Matt Freeman, musician and bassist of Rancid and Operation Ivy 
 Edith Frost, musician
 Edi Gathegi
 Tyson Griffin, UFC fighter
 Ron Hansen, former Major League Baseball player
 Lil B, rapper, artist
 Lil Debbie, rapper, artist
 Robert Koga, martial artist and police trainer 
 Ron Silliman, poet
 Angel Tompkins, actress

See also
 Albany Hill
 Gill Tract
 Marin Creek

References

External links 

 

 
1909 establishments in California
Cities in Alameda County, California
Cities in the San Francisco Bay Area
Incorporated cities and towns in California
Populated places established in 1909
Populated coastal places in California